Agostinho F. Silva (born November 5, 1963) is an American politician who is a Democratic member of the Rhode Island House of Representatives, representing the 56th District from 2007 to 2015. As a representative, Silva served on the House Committees on Finance, and Rules. Silva chose not to seek reelection in 2014, and was succeeded by Shelby Maldonado.

References

External links
Rhode Island House - Representative Agostinho F. Silva official RI House website

Democratic Party members of the Rhode Island House of Representatives
1963 births
Living people
American people of Portuguese descent
People from Central Falls, Rhode Island